This list of the Cenozoic life of Virginia contains the various prehistoric life-forms whose fossilized remains have been reported from within the US state of Virginia and are between 66 million and 10,000 years of age.

A

 †Abdounia
 †Abdounia beaugei
 †Abdounia minutissima
 †Abdounia recticona
 Abies
 †Abra
 †Abra aequalis
  Acanthocybium
 †Acanthocybium proosti
 Accipiter
  †Accipiter striatus
 †Achilleodinium
 †Achilleodinium bioformoides
  Acipenser
 Acmaea
 Acteocina
 †Acteocina canaliculata
 †Acteocina candei
 Acteon
 †Acteon novellus
 †Actinocyclus
 †Actinocyclus ellipticus
 †Actinoptychus
 †Actinoptychus marylandicus
 †Actinoptychus virginicus
  Actitis – or unidentified comparable form
 †Actitis macularia
 †Adeorbis
 Aegolius
 †Aegolius acadicus
 Aequipecten
 †Aequipecten eboreus
 Aetobatus
 †Aetobatus arcuatus
 †Aetobatus irregularis
 Aetomylaeus
 Agelaius
 †Agelaius phoeniceus
  †Aglaocetus
 †Aglaocetus patulus – type locality for species
 †Aglyptorhynchus
 †Aglyptorhynchus venablesi
 Albula
 †Albula eppsi
 Alca
 †Alca torda – or unidentified comparable form
  Alces – or unidentified comparable form
 †Alces alces
 Aligena
 †Aligena aequata
  †Allaeochelys
 Alnus
 †Alopecias
 †Alopecias grandis – type locality for species
 Alopias
 Aluterus
 †Ambystoma
 Amia
 Amiantis – tentative report
 Ammonia
 †Ammonia limbatobeccarii
 †Ammonia sobrina
 †Ammonia tepida
 †Amonia
 †Amonia limbatobeccarii
 †Amonia limbatobeccarrii
 †Amonia sobrina
 †Amonia tepida
 †Ampelopsis
  Amyda – or unidentified comparable form
 †Amyda pennata
 Anachis
 †Anachis avara
 †Anachis camax – or unidentified comparable form
 †Anachis harrisii
 Anadara
 †Anadara arata
 †Anadara callicestosa
 †Anadara lienosa
 †Anadara ovalis
  †Anadara transversa
 †Anapteris
 †Anapteris regalis
 Anas
 †Anas crecca
  †Anas discors
 †Anas platyrhynchos – or unidentified comparable form
 Anguilla
 †Anguilla bostoniensis – or unidentified comparable form
 †Anguispira
  †Anguispira alternata
 Angulus
 †Angulus agilis
 †Angulus texanus
 Anisodonta – tentative report
 Anomia
 †Anomia lisbonensis
 †Anomia ruffini
 †Anomia simplex
 †Anomotodon
 †Anomotodon novus
  Anoxypristis
 †Anoxypristis macrodens
 †Anthus – or unidentified comparable form
 †Anthus spinoletta
  Aporrhais
 †Aporrhais potomacensis
 †Araloselachus
 †Araloselachus cuspidata
 Arbacia
 †Arbacia improcera
 †Archaeohippus
 †Archaeomanta
 †Archaeomanta melenhorsti
 Architectonica
 †Architectonica ianthinae
  †Arctodus
 †Arctodus simus
 Argobuccinum
 Argopecten
  †Argopecten gibbus
 Arius – tentative report
 Arossia
 †Arossia glyptopoma
 †Arossia newmani
 †Ashleychelys
 †Ashleychelys palmeri
 Asio
  †Asio flammeus – or unidentified comparable form
 †Aspideretoides
 †Aspideretoides virginianus – type locality for species
 Astarte
 †Astarte castanea
 †Astarte cobhamensis
 †Astarte coheni
 †Astarte concentrica
 †Astarte deltoidea
 †Astarte exaltata
 †Astarte obruta
 †Astarte perplana
 †Astarte rappahannockensis
 †Astarte undulata
 †Astarte vaginulata
 Astrangia
 †Astrangia danae
 †Astroscopus
 Astyris
 †Astyris communis
 †Astyris lunata
  Athleta
 †Athleta haleanus – or unidentified comparable form
 †Athleta petrosa
 †Athleta tuomeyi
 †Atractodon
 †Atractodon stonei

B

 Balaena
 †Balaena ricei – type locality for species
 Balaenoptera
  †Balaenotus
 Balanophyllia
 †Balanophyllia conradi – type locality for species
 †Balanophyllia elaborata
 Balanus
  †Balanus improvisus
 †Balbocerosoma
 Barbatia
 †Barbatia carolinensis – tentative report
 Barnea
 †Barnea costata
 †Barnea truncata
 Bartramia
 †Bartramia longicauda
 †Basilotritus
 †Basilotritus wardii
 Bathytormus
 †Bathytormus alaeformis
 †Beckettia – tentative report
 Betula
 Bicorbula
 †Bicorbula idonea
 Bison
  †Bison bison
 Bittiolum
 †Bittiolum alternatum
 Blarina
 †Blarina brevicauda
  †Bohaskaia – type locality for genus
 †Bohaskaia monodontoides – type locality for species
  †Bolcyrus – or unidentified comparable form
 †Bolcyrus formosissimus
 Bolivina
 Bombycilla
 †Bombycilla cedrorum
 Bonasa
 †Bonasa umbellus
 †Bonasa umbrellus
 †Bootherium
  †Bootherium bombifrons
 Boreotrophon
 †Boreotrophon tetricus
 Bornia
 †Bornia longipes
 †Bornia triangulata
 Bos
 †Bos taurus
 Bostrycapulus
 †Bostrycapulus aculeatus
 Botaurus
 †Botaurus lentiginosus
 Brachidontes
 †Brachidontes potomacensis
 Brachiodontes
 Branta
 †Branta bernicla
 †Brevoortia
 †Brychaetus
 †Brychaetus muelleri
 Bubo
  †Bubo virginianus
 Buccella
 †Buccella depressa
 †Buccinifusus
 †Buccinifusus parilis
 Buccinofusus
 †Buccinofusus parilis
 Buccinum
 †Buccinum undatum
 Bucephala
 †Bucephala albeola
  Bufo
 †Bufo woodhousei
 Buliminella
 †Buliminella elegantissima – or unidentified comparable form
 †Bulliopsis
 †Bulliopsis quadrata
 †Burnhamia
 †Burnhamia daviesi
 Busycon
 †Busycon carica
 †Busycon caricum
  †Busycon contrarium
 †Busycon coronatum
 †Busycon incile
 †Busycon maximum
 †Busycon maximus
 Busycotypus
 †Busycotypus canaliculatus
 †Busycotypus coronatum
 †Busycotypus incile
 †Busycotypus rugosum
 Buteo
  †Buteo jamaicensis
 †Buteo lineatus
 †Buteo platypterus

C

 †Cacharias
 Cadulus
 †Cadulus thallus
 Caecum
 †Caecum cooperi
 Caestocorbula
 †Caestocorbula fossata
 †Calasoma
 †Calippus
 †Calippus regulus – or unidentified comparable form
  Calliostoma
 †Calliostoma bellum
 †Calliostoma philanthropus
 †Calliostoma philothropus
 †Calliostoma virginicum
 †Callippus
 †Callippus regulus – or unidentified comparable form
 Callista
 †Callista perovata
 Callocardia
 †Callocardia catharia
  Calonectris
 †Calonectris kurodai – type locality for species
 †Calophos
 †Calophos plicatile
 †Calorhadia
 †Calorhadia bella
 †Calorhadia opulenta
 †Calorhadia semen
 †Calyptraphorus
 †Calyptraphorus trinodiferus
 †Calyptraphorus velatus
  Cambarus
 †Cambarus bartonii – or unidentified comparable form
 †Cambarus longulus – or unidentified comparable form
 †Campanuyla
 Canachites
 †Canachites canadensis
  †Canarium
 †Canarium parksii
 Cancellaria
 Cancer
  †Cancer irroratus
 Canis
  †Canis dirus
 †Canis latrans
 †Canis lupus – or unidentified comparable form
 Cantharus
 †Cantharus marylandicus
 Canthon
 Capella
 †Capella gallinago
 Carcharhinus
 Carcharias
 †Carcharias hopei
 †Carcharias teretidens
 Carcharodon
  †Carcharodon hastalis
 Carditamera
 †Carditamera arata
 †Caricella
 †Carinorbis
 †Carinorbis dalli
 †Carolinapecten
 †Carolinapecten eboreus
 †Carolinapecten urbannaensis
 †Carolinochelys
 †Carolinochelys wilsoni
 Carphophis
  †Carphophis amoenus
 Carya
 Caryocorbula
 †Caryocorbula caribaea
 †Caryocorbula conradi
 †Caryocorbula contracta
 †Caryocorbula deusseni
 Castor
 †Castor canadensis
  †Castoroides
 †Castoroides ohioensis
 Catharus
 †Catinella
 Catoptrophorus
 †Catoptrophorus semipalmatus
 †Catostomus
 Celtis
 †Celtis occidentalis
 Cerithiopsis
 †Cerithiopsis greenii
 Certhia
 †Certhia familiaris
 †Cervalces – tentative report
  †Cervalces scotti
 Cervus
 †Cervus elaphus
 Cetorhinus
  †Cetotherium
 †Cetotherium crassangulum – type locality for species
 Chaetura
 †Chaetura pelagica
 Chama
 †Chama congregata
 †Charadrisu
 †Charadrisu vociferus
 Charadrius
  †Charadrius vociferus
 Chelydra
  †Chelydra serpentina
 †Chesacardium
 †Chesacardium acutilaqueatum
 †Chesacardium laqueatum
 †Chesaconcavus
 †Chesaconcavus myosulcatus
 †Chesaconcavus proteus
 †Chesaconcavus rossi
 †Chesaconcavus santamaria
 †Chesapactern
 †Chesapactern madisonius
 †Chesapecten
 †Chesapecten clintonius
 †Chesapecten coccymelus
 †Chesapecten edgecombensis
  †Chesapecten jeffersonius
 †Chesapecten madisonianis
 †Chesapecten madisonius
 †Chesapecten middlesexensis
 †Chesapecten nefrens
 †Chesapecten santamaria
 Chione
  †Chione cancellata
 †Chione cribraria
 Chlamys
 †Chlamys brookvillensis
 †Chlamys choctavensis
 †Chlamys decemaria
 †Chlamys johnsoni
 †Chlamys santamaria
 †Chlamys seabeensis
 †Chlamys vaunwythei – or unidentified comparable form
 †Chlamys wahtubbeana
 †Chordeiles
  †Chordeiles minor
 Cibicides
 †Cibicides lobatulus
 Cingula
 †Cingula norfolkensis
 Circulus
 †Circulus liratus
 Cirsotrema
  Cistothorus
 †Cistothorus platensis – or unidentified comparable form
 Clavus – report made of unidentified related form or using admittedly obsolete nomenclature
 †Clavus eburnea
 †Cleistosphaeridium
 †Cleistosphaeridium placacanthum
 Clethrionomys
 †Clethrionomys gapperi
 Clidiophora
 †Clidiophora crassidens
  Cliona
 Coccyzus
 †Cochliolepsis
 Colaptes
 †Colaptes auratus
 Colinus
 †Colinus virginianus
 Coluber
 †Coluber constrictor
 †Columella
 †Columella simplex
  Colus
 †Colus pygmaeus
 Condylura
 †Condylura cristata
 †Condylura crystata
 †Conradostrea
 †Conradostrea sculpturata
 Contopus
 †Contopus virens
 †Contropus
 †Contropus virens
  Conus
 †Conus adversarius
 †Conus deluvianus
 †Conus diluvianus
 †Conus marylandicus
  Corbula
 †Corbula extenuata
 †Corbula inaequalis
 †Corbula subengota
 †Corbula texana
 †Coronia
 †Corrundinium
 Corvus
 †Corvus brachyrhynchos
 †Corynorynchus
 †Costaglycymeris
 †Costaglycymeris mixoni
 †Costaglycymeris subovata
 †Costaglycymeris virginiae
 Cotonopsis
 †Cotonopsis lafresnayi
 †Coturnipes – or unidentified comparable form
 †Coturnipes cooperi
 †Coupatezia
 †Coupatezia woatersi
 Crassatella
 †Crassatella aquiana – type locality for species
 Crassinella
 †Crassinella lunulata
 †Crassinella minor
  Crassostrea
 †Crassostrea virginica
 Crepidula
 †Crepidula convexa
 †Crepidula dumosa
  †Crepidula fornicata
 †Crepidula plana
 †Crepidula radiata
 †Crepidula spinosium
  †Cretolamna
 †Cretolamna appendiculata
 Cribrilina
 †Cribrilina punctata
 †Cribroperidinium
  Crocodylus
 †Crocodylus antiquus – type locality for species
 Crotalus
 †Crotalus adamanteus – or unidentified comparable form
 †Crotalus horridus
 Crucibulum
 †Crucibulum constrictum
 †Crucibulum costata
 †Crucibulum ramosum
 †Crucibulum striatum
 Cryptobranchus
  †Cryptobranchus alleganiensis
 †Cryptogramma
 †Cryptogramma acrosticoides
 Cryptosula
 †Cryptosula pallasiana
 Cryptotis
 †Cryptotis parva
 Ctena
 †Ctena speciosa
 †Cubitostrea
 †Cubitostrea divaricata
 †Cubitostrea sellaeformis
  Cucullaea
 †Cucullaea gigantea
 †Cucullaea transversa
 Cumingia
 †Cumingia tellinoides
 †Cuneocorbula
 †Cuneocorbula subengonata
 Cupuladria
 †Cupuladria biporosa
 †Cupuladria owenii
 Cyanocitta
 †Cyanocitta cristata
 Cyclocardia
 †Cyclocardia borealis
 †Cyclocardia granulata
  †Cyclopoma
 †Cyclopoma folmeri – type locality for species
 Cyclostremiscus
 †Cyclostremiscus obliquestriatus
 Cylichna
 †Cylichna cylindricus
 †Cylichna cylindrus
 †Cylichna venusta
 †Cylindracanthus
 †Cylindracanthus rectus
 †Cymatogonia
 †Cymatogonia amblyoceros
 Cymatosyrinx
 †Cymatosyrinx lunata
   †Cynelos
 †Cynelos idoneus – or unidentified comparable form
 Cynoscion
 Cyrtopleura
 †Cyrtopleura arcuata
 †Cyrtopleura costata

D

 †Dallarca
 †Dallarca carolinensis
 †Dallarca elevata
 †Dallarca idonea
 †Dallarca virginiae
  Dasyatis
 Dasypus
  †Dasypus bellus – or unidentified comparable form
 †Deflandrea
 †Deflandrea phosphoritica
 †Delphineis
 †Delphineis angustata
 †Delphineis biseriata
 †Delphineis novaecaesaraea
 †Delphineis penelliptica
 †Delphinodon
 †Delphinodon dividum
 Dendrocopos
 †Dendrocopos pubescens
 †Dendrocopos villosus
 †Dendrogapus – or unidentified comparable form
 †Dendrogapus canadensis
 †Dendroica – or unidentified comparable form
  †Dendroica coronata
 Dentalium
 †Dentalium alternatum
 †Dentalium attenuatum
 †Dentalium carolinense
 †Dentalium carolinensis
 †Denticulopsis
 †Denticulopsis hustedtii
 Dentimargo
 †Dentimargo aureocinctus
 Desmognathus
 Diadophis
 Dicaelus
 †Diemichtylus
 †Diemichtylus viridescens
 Dinocardium
  †Dinocardium robustum
 Diodora
 †Diodora auroraensis – or unidentified comparable form
 †Diodora redimicula
  †Diorocetus
 †Diorocetus hiatus
  †Diplocynodon
 †Diplocynodon hantoniensis
 Diplodonta
 †Diplodonta acclinis
 †Diplodonta hopkinsensis
 †Diplodonta leana
 †Diplodonta punctata
 †Diplodonta ungulina
 Discinisca
 †Discinisca lugubris
 †Discoaster
 Discoporella
 †Discoporella umbellata
 Discus
  †Discus catskillensis
 Divalinga
 †Divalinga quadrisulcata
 †Dolicholatirus
 †Dolichonyx – or unidentified comparable form
 †Dolichonyx oryzivorus
 †Dollochelys – tentative report
 Donax
 †Donax parvula
 †Donax variabilis
 Dosinia
 †Dosinia acetabulm
 †Dosinia acetabulum
 †Dosinia discus
 †Dosiniopsis
 †Dosiniopsis lenticularis
 Dryocopus
  †Dryocopus pileatus

E

 †Eburneopecten
 †Eburneopecten dalli
 †Eburneopecten scintillatus – or unidentified comparable form
 Echinocardium
 †Echinocardium orthonotum
 Echinorhinus
 †Echinorhinus priscus
 †Ecphora
  †Ecphora gardnerae
 †Ecphora kochi
 †Ecphora quadricostata
 †Ecphora tampaensis
 †Ectopistes
  †Ectopistes migratorius
 †Egertonia
 †Egertonia isodonta
 Elaphe
 †Elaphe guttata – or unidentified comparable form
 †Elaphe obsoleta – or unidentified comparable form
 Electra
 †Electra monostachys
 Elphidium
 †Elphidium articulatum
 †Elphidium brooklynense
 †Elphidium clavatum
 †Elphidium discoidale
 †Elphidium excavatum
 †Elphidium galvestonense
 †Elphidium gunteri
 †Elphidium incertum
 †Elphidium latispatium
 †Elphidium subarticum
 †Elphidium tumidum
 †Elytrocysta
 †Empidonax
 Ensis
 †Ensis directus
 †Ensis ensiformis
  †Eobalaenoptera – type locality for genus
 †Eobalaenoptera harrisoni – type locality for species
 Eontia
 †Eontia ponderosa
 †Eopleurotoma – or unidentified comparable form
 †Eopleurotoma harrisi
 †Eopleurotoma potomacensis
  †Eosphargis
 †Eosphargis gigas
 †Eosphargis insularis
  †Eosuchus
 †Eosuchus lerichei
 †Eosuchus minor
 Epitonium
 †Epitonium angulatum
 †Epitonium championi
 †Epitonium humphreysii
 †Epitonium multistriatum
 †Epitonium potomacense
 †Epitonium rupicola
 †Epitonium virginianum
 Eptesicus
 †Eptesicus fuscus
 Equus
 †Equus complicatus
 †Equus fraternus
 Eremophila
  †Eremophila alpestris
 Erethizon
 †Erethizon dorsatum
 Erolia
 †Erolia minutilla
 †Erycinella
 †Erycinella ovalis
 Eschrichtius
 †Eschrichtius leptocentrus – type locality for species
  †Eschrichtius robustus
 Esox
  †Esox americanus – or unidentified comparable form
 †Esthonyx – or unidentified comparable form
 Eucrassatella
 Eulima
 †Eulima dalli
 †Eulima rectiuscula
 †Euloxa
 †Euloxa latisulcata
 Eumeces
 †Eumeces laticeps – or unidentified comparable form
 Eupleura
 †Eupleura caudata
  †Eurhinodelphis
 †Eurhinodelphis longirostris
 Euspira
 †Euspira heros
 †Euspira marylandica
 Eutamias
 †Eutamias minimus
 Euvola

F

 Falco
  †Falco sparverius
 Felis
 †Felis domesticus
 Ficus
 †Ficus affinis
 †Fisherichthys – type locality for genus
 †Fisherichthys folmeri – type locality for species
 Flabellum
 Fossarus
 †Fossarus lura
 †Fossarus lyra
 Fusinus
 †Fusinus exilis

G

  Gadus
  Galeocerdo
 †Galeocerdo aduncus
 †Galeocerdo contortus
 †Galeocerdo latidens
 Galeodea
 Galeorhinus
 †Galeorhinus ypresiensis
 Galerita
 †Galerita bicolor – or unidentified comparable form
 Gallinula
 †Gallinula chloropus
 Gari
 Gastrochaena
 Gastrocopta
 †Gastrocopta armifera
 †Gastrocopta contracta
 Gavia
  †Gavialosuchus
 †Gavialosuchus antiquus
 Gemma
 †Gemma magna
 †Gemma purpurea
 Genota – or unidentified comparable form
 †Genota bellistriata
  Geomys
 Geukensia
 †Geukensia demissa
 Gibbula – tentative report
 †Gibbula glandula
  Ginglymostoma
 †Ginglymostoma africanam
 †Ginglymostoma serra
 †Ginglymostoma subafricanum
 †Glaphyrocysta
 Glaucomys
 †Glaucomys sabrinus
 Globigerina
 †Globigerina apertura
 †Globoquadrina
 †Globoquadrina hirsuta
 Globulina
 Glossus
 †Glossus fraterna
 †Glossus fraternas
 †Glossus marylandica
 †Glossus santamaria
 †Glottidia
 †Glottidia inexpectans
  Glycymeris
 †Glycymeris americana
 †Glycymeris idonea
 †Glycymeris lisbonensis
 †Glycymeris trigonella
 †Glycymeris tumulus – or unidentified comparable form
 †Goniothecium
 †Goniothecium rogersii
 Gouldia
 †Gouldia metastriata
 Granulina
 †Granulina ovuliformis
 Grus
  †Grus americana
 †Gryphaeostrea

H

 †Hadrodelphis – or unidentified comparable form
 †Hadrodelphis calvertense
 †Haldea
 †Halicetus – tentative report
 †Halicetus ignotus
 Halichoerus
  †Halichoerus grypus
 Hanzawaia
 †Hanzawaia concentrica
  Hastula
 †Hastula simplex
 Haynesina
 †Haynesina germanica
 Helicodiscus
 †Helicodiscus inermis
 †Helicodiscus jacksoni
 †Helicodiscus parallelus
 Hemimactra
 †Hemimactra confraga
 †Hemimactra solidissima
  Hemipristis
 †Hemipristis serra
 Hendersonia
 †Hendersonia occulia
 †Hendersonia occulta
 †Heteraulacacysta
  Heterodontus
 †Heterodontus lerichei
 †Heterotorpedo
 †Heterotorpedo fowleri
 Hexanchus
 Hiatella
 †Hiatella arctica
 Hipponix
 †Hipponix pygmaeus
 Hippoporidra
 †Hippoporidra calcarea
 Hippoporina
 †Hippoporina porosa
  †Homogalax – or unidentified related form
 Hydrobia
 †Hydrobia truncata
 Hydroides
 †Hydroides dianthus
 †Hydroides diantthus
 Hyla
 †Hyla crucifer – or unidentified comparable form
 Hylocichla
  †Hyopsodus – or unidentified comparable form
 †Hypolophodon
 †Hypolophodon sylvestris
 †Hyposaurus – or unidentified comparable form
 †Hystrichokolpoma

I

 †Icterus – or unidentified comparable form
  †Icterus spurius
 Ilyanassa
 †Ilyanassa arata
 †Ilyanassa granifera
 †Ilyanassa obsoleta
 †Ilyanassa procina
 †Ilyanassa trivittata
 †Iodes
 †Iodes multireticulata
 Ischadium
 †Ischadium recurvum
 Isistius
 †Isistius trituratus
 †Isognomen
 †Isognommen
 Isognomon
 †Isognomon maxilliata
 †Isognomon maxilliatus
  Istiophorus
 Isurus

J

 †Jacquhermania
 †Jacquhermania duponti
 Junco
  †Junco hyemalis

K

 Kalolophus
 †Kalolophus antillarum
 †Kapalmerella
 †Kapalmerella mortoni
  †Kentriodon
 †Kentriodon pernix
  Kuphus
 †Kuphus calamus
 †Kuphus fistula
 Kurtziella
 †Kurtziella cerina

L

 †Laevihastula
 †Laevihastula simplex
 Lagena
  †Lagopus
 †Lagopus mutus – or unidentified comparable form
 Lamna
 †Lamna obliqua
 Lampropeltis
 †Lampropeltis doliata
 Larus
  †Larus hyperboreus
 Lasiurus
 †Lasiurus borealis
 Latirus
 †Latirus marylandicus
 Lepisosteus
 †Leptomactra
 †Leptomactra delumbis
 †Leptophoca
 †Leptophoca lenis
 †Leptophoca proxima – or unidentified comparable form
  †Leptoxis
 †Leptoxis carinata
 Lepus
  †Lepus americanus
 †Levifusus
 †Levifusus trabeatus
 Libinia
 †Libinia dubia
 †Libinia emarginata
 †Limosa – or unidentified comparable form
 Linga
 †Linga amiantus
  †Lingulodinium
 †Lingulodinium machaerophorum
 †Lirodiscus
 †Lirodiscus virginianus
 †Lirofusus – or unidentified comparable form
 Lirophora
 †Lirophora alveata
 †Lirophora dalli
 †Lirophora latilirata
 †Lirophora vredenburgi
 †Lirosoma
 †Lirosoma sulcata
 †Lirosoma sulcosa
 Litiopa
 †Litiopa marylandica
 Littoraria
 †Littoraria irrorata
 Lontra
  †Lontra canadensis
 Lophius
 †Lophius sagittidens
 †Lophocysta – tentative report
 Lophodytes
 †Lophodytes cucullatus
 Lopholatilus
 Loxia
 Lucina
 †Lucina aquiana – type locality for species
 †Lucina divaricata
 †Lucina pomilia
 †Lucina squamata
 Lucinisca
 †Lucinisca cribarius
 Lucinoma
 †Lucinoma contracta
 Lunatia
 †Lunatia interna
 †Lutianus
 Lydiphnis
 †Lydiphnis novicastri
  Lymnaea
 †Lymnaea catascopium
 Lynx
  †Lynx rufus – or unidentified comparable form
 Lyonsia
 †Lyonsia hyalina

M

 Macoma
  †Macoma balthica
 †Macoma calcarea
 †Macoma constricta
 †Macoma tenta
 Macrocallista
 †Macrocallista reposta
 †Macrocallista subimpressa
 Mactrodesma
 †Mactrodesma subponderosa
 †Mactropsis
 †Mactropsis olssoni
 Makaira
  †Makaira nigricans – or unidentified comparable form
 †Mammut
 †Mammut americaneum
 †Mammut americanum
 †Mammuthus
  †Mammuthus columbi
  †Mammuthus primigenius
 Marevalvata
 †Marevalvata tricarinata
 †Margaritaria
 †Margaritaria abrupta
 Marginella
 †Marginella bella
 †Marginella denticulata
 †Mariacolpus
 †Mariacolpus plebeia
 †Mariafusus
 †Mariafusus marylandica
 Marmota
  †Marmota monax
 †Marvacrassatella
 †Marvacrassatella cyclopterus
 †Marvacrassatella marylandica
 †Marvacrassatella surryensis
 †Marvacrassatella turgidula
 †Marvacrassatella undulata
 †Marvacrassatella undulatus
 †Marvacrassatella urbannaensis
 †Marvacrassatella urbannensis
 Massilina
 Masticophis
 †Masticophis flagellum
 †Mclelannia
 †Mclelannia aenigma
 Megaceryle
 †Megaceryle alcyon
  †Megalonyx
 †Megalonyx jeffersonii
 Megalops
  Megaptera
 †Megaptera expansa
 Melanerpes
 †Melanerpes carolinus
 †Melanerpes erythrocephalus
 Meleagris
  †Meleagris gallopavo
 Mellita
 †Mellita aclinensis
 †Mellita aclinus
 Melospiza
 †Melospiza melodia
 Membranipora
 †Membranipora tenuis
 Membraniporella
 †Membraniporella petasus – or unidentified comparable form
 Mephitis
 †Mephitis mephitis
 Mercenaria
 †Mercenaria campechiensis
 †Mercenaria capax
 †Mercenaria corrugata
 †Mercenaria cuneata
 †Mercenaria druidi
 †Mercenaria inflata
  †Mercenaria mercenaria
 †Mercenaria tetrica
 Mergus
 †Meridiania
 †Meridiania conyexa
  †Merychippus
 †Mesocetus
 †Mesocetus pusillus
 †Mesocetus siphunculus – type locality for species
 Mesoplodon
 †Mesoplodon longirostris – or unidentified comparable form
 †Mesorhytis – tentative report
 †Mesorhytis pomonkensis
  †Metaxytherium
 †Metaxytherium crataegense
 †Metaxytherium cratagense
 †Metopocetus – type locality for genus
 †Metopocetus durinasus – type locality for species
 Microporella
 †Microporella ciliata
 Microtus
 †Microtus chrotorrhinus
 †Microtus ochrogaster
 †Microtus pennsylvanicus
  †Microtus pinetorum
 †Microtus xanthognathus
 †Microtus zanthognathus
 Mictomys
 †Mictomys borealis
 Miltha
 †Miltha aquiana
 †Miocepphus
 †Miocepphus blowi – type locality for species
 †Miocepphus bohaskai
 †Miocepphus mcclungi
 Mitrella
 †Mitrella communius
 Modiolus
 †Modiolus ducateli
 †Modiolus squamosus
 Mola
 Molothrus
  †Molothrus ater
 †Monotherium
 †Monotherium wymani
 Morus
  †Morus bassanus
  †Moxostoma
 Mulinia
 †Mulinia congesta
 †Mulinia congregata
 †Mulinia lateralis
 †Multiporina
 †Multiporina cornuta
 Musculus
 †Musculus lateralis
 †Musculus virginica
 Mustela
 †Mustela americana
 †Mustela nivalis
†Mustela richardsonii
 †Mya
 †Mya arenaria
 †Mya wilsoni – tentative report
  Myliobatis
 †Myliobatis dixoni
 †Myliobatis latidens
 †Myliobatis striatus
  †Mylohyus
 †Mylohyus fossilis
 Myochama
 Myotis
 †Myotis grisescens
 †Myotis keenii
 †Myotis lucifugus
 Myriophyllum
 Myrtea – tentative report
 †Myrtea curta – or unidentified comparable form
 †Myrtea uhleri
 Mytilus
 †Mytilus edulis

N

 †Nannaria
 †Nanogyra
 †Nanogyra virgula
 Napaeozapus
  †Napaeozapus insignis
 †Napeozapus
 †Napeozapus insignis
  Nassarius
 †Nassarius marylandica
 †Nassarius peralta
 Naticarius
 Natrix
 Nebrius
 †Nebrius thielensis
  Negaprion
 Nemocardium
 Neofiber
 †Neofiber leonardi
 †Neopanope
 †Neopanope texana
 Neogale
†Neogale frenata
†Neogale vison
Neotoma
  †Neotoma floridana
 Nerodia
 †Nerodia sipedon
 Neverita
 †Neverita duplicatus
 †Ninoziphius
 †Ninoziphius platyrostris – or unidentified comparable form
 †Nipa – or unidentified comparable form
 †Nipa burtini
 Niso
 †Nocomis
  †Nocomis raneyi – or unidentified comparable form
 Noetia
 †Noetia incile
 Nonion
 Nonionella
 †Nonionella atlantica
 Notidanus
 †Notidanus primigenius
 Notophthalmus
  †Notophthalmus viridescens – or unidentified comparable form
 Notorhynchus
  Notorynchus
 †Notorynchus cepidianus
 †Noturus
 Nucula
 †Nucula ovula
 †Nucula proxima
 †Nucula taphria
 Nuculana
 †Nuculana acuta
 †Nuculana cliftonensis
 †Nuculana coelatella
 †Nuculana cultelliformis
 †Nuculana improcera
 †Nyssa
 †Nyssa sylavtica

O

 Ochotona
  Ocypode
 Odobenus
  †Odobenus rosmarus
 Odocoileus
 †Odocoileus virginianus
 Odontaspis
 †Odontaspis macrota
 †Odontaspis winkleri
  †Odontopteryx – tentative report
 Odostomia
 Oliva
 †Oliva canaliculata
 †Oliva carolinae
 †Oliva sayana
 Olivella
 †Olivella mutica
 Ondatra
 †Ondatra zibethicus
 Onthophagus
 †Onthophagus janus – or unidentified comparable form
 †Ontocetus – type locality for genus
 †Ontocetus emmonsi – type locality for species
 †Operculodinium
 Opheodrys
 †Opsanus
 Orthoyoldia
 †Orthoyoldia psammotaea
  †Orycterocetus
 †Orycterocetus crocodilinus – type locality for species
 †Osteopygis
 †Osteopygis roundsi – type locality for species
  †Ostracion
 †Ostracion meretrix
 Ostrea
 †Ostrea alepidota
 †Ostrea compressirostra
 †Ostrea raveneliana
 †Ostrea sinuosa
 †Otodus
  †Otodus megalodon
 Otus
 †Otus asio
 †Oxyrhina
 †Oxyrhina retroflexa
 †Oxyura
 †Oxyura jamaicensis

P

 †Pachecoa
 †Pachecoa decisa – or unidentified comparable form
 †Pachecoa ellipsis
 †Pachygaleus
 †Pachygaleus lefevrei
 †Palaeocystodinium
 †Palaeocystodinium golzowense
 †Palaeogaleus
 †Palaeogaleus vincenti
 †Palaeohypotodus
 †Palaeohypotodus ratoti
  †Palaeophis
 †Palaeophis casei
 †Palaeophis grandis
 †Palaeophis toliapicus
 †Palaeophis virginianus – type locality for species
 †Palaeorhincodon
 †Palaeorhincodon wardi
  †Palaeosinopa – or unidentified comparable form
 Pandora
 †Pandora arenosa
 †Pandora gouldiana
 †Pandora trilineata
 Panopea
 †Panopea elongata
 †Panopea goldfussi
 †Panopea goldfussii
 †Panopea reflexa
 Panopeus
 †Panopeus herbstii
 Panthera
  †Panthera leo
 Paraconcavus
 †Paraconcavus neusensis
 †Paraconcavus prebrevicalcar
 †Paralbula
 †Paralbula marylandica
 †Paramya
 †Paramya subovata
 Parascalops
  †Parascalops breweri
  †Parietobalaena
 †Parietobalaena palmeri
 †Parophisaurus
 †Parophisaurus mccloskeyi – type locality for species
  Parus
 †Parus bicolor
 Parvanachis
 †Parvanachis obesa
 Parvilucina
 †Parvilucina crenulata
 †Parvilucina multilineatus
 †Parvilucina multistriata
 Passerella
  †Passerella iliaca
 Pecten
 †Pecten humphreysii
 †Pecten marylandica
 †Pecten perplanus
 †Pecten seabeensis
 †Pedalion
 †Pedalion maxillatum
 Pedioecetes
 †Pedioecetes phasianellus
 Pekania
 †Pekania pennanti – or unidentified comparable form
  †Pelagornis
 †Pelocetus
 †Pelocetus calvertensis
 †Pentadinium
 †Pentadinium goniferum
 †Pentadinium laticinctum
 †Peradectes
 †Peradectes guottai – type locality for species
 †Perimyotis
 †Perimyotis subflavus
 Periploma
 †Periploma leanum
 Perisoreus
  †Perisoreus canadensis
 †Perisorus
 †Perisorus canadensis
 Peristernia
 †Peristernia filicata
 Peromyscus
 †Peromyscus leucopus
  †Peromyscus maniculatus
  Petaloconchus
 †Petaloconchus graniferus
 †Petaloconchus virginica
 †Petriathyris
 Petricola
 †Petricola pholadiformis
 Petrochelidon
 †Petrochelidon pyrrhonota
 †Petrocheliodon
 †Petrocheliodon pyrrhonota
 †Phalacrocoras
 †Phalacrocoras auritus
 Phalacrocorax
  †Phalacrocorax auritus
 †Phenacomya
 †Phenacomya petrosa
 Phenacomys
 †Phenacomys intermedius
 †Phenacomys ungava – or unidentified comparable form
 †Phocageneus – type locality for genus
 †Phocageneus venustus – type locality for species
  Pholadomya
 †Pholadomya marylandica
 Pholas
 †Pholas petrosa – tentative report
 Phyllodus
 †Phyllodus toliapicus
 Physa
 †Physa heterostropha
 †Physogaleus
 †Physogaleus contortus
 †Physogaleus secundas
  †Phytolacca
 †Phytolacca decandra
 Pica
 †Pica pica
 Picea
 †Pinguinus
  †Pinguinus impennis
 Pinicola – or unidentified comparable form
 †Pinicola enucleator
 †Pinquinus
 †Pinquinus impennis
 Pinus
 †Pipestrellus
 †Pipestrellus subflavus
 Pipistrellus
 †Pipistrellus subflavus
 Piranga
 Pisania
 †Pisania nux
 Pisidium
 †Pisidium dubium
 †Pisodus
 †Pisodus oweni
  Pitar
 †Pitar eversus
 †Pitar morrhuanus
 †Pitar ovatus
 †Pitar pyga
 Placopecten
 †Placopecten clintonius
 †Placopecten princepoides
 †Plagiarca
 †Plagiarca rhomboidella
  †Platygonus
 †Platygonus compressus
 †Platygonus vetus
 Plecotus
 †Plecotus townsendii – or unidentified comparable form
 †Pleiorytis
 †Pleiorytis centenaria
 Pleuromeris
 †Pleuromeris tridentata
 Plicatula
 †Plicatula filamentosa
 †Plicatula gibbosa
 Pluvialis
 †Pluvialis dominica
 Podiceps
  †Podiceps auritus
 Podilymbus
 †Podilymbus podiceps
 Pogonias
 †Pogonias multidentatus – type locality for species
 Polinices
 †Polinices aratus
 Polydora
 Polygonum
 †Pomatiopsis
 †Pomatiopsis lapidaria
 †Pooecetes
 †Pooecetes gramineus
 Poroeponides
 †Poroeponides lateralis
 †Poroeponides repanda – or unidentified comparable form
 Porzana
 †Porzana carolina
 †Potamogeton
 †Premontria
 †Premontria degremonti
  †Prionodon
 †Prionodon egertoni
 Prionotus
 †Priscoficus
 †Priscoficus arguta
  Pristis
 †Pristis brachyodon – type locality for species
 †Pristis luthami
  †Procamelus – or unidentified comparable form
 †Procolpochelys
 †Procolpochelys charlestonensis
 †Procolpochelys grandaeva
 Procyon
  †Procyon lotor
 †Prolates
 †Prolates dormaalensis
 †Pronum
 †Pronum roscidum
 †Propristis
 †Propristis schweinfurthi
 †Prosthennops – report made of unidentified related form or using admittedly obsolete nomenclature
 †Prosthennops xiphidonticus
 †Protautoga
 †Protautoga conidens
 †Protelphidium
 †Protelphidium tisburyense
 Prunum
 †Prunum limatulum
 †Prunum roscidum
  Psammechinus
 †Psammechinus philanthopus
 †Psammechinus philanthropus
  †Psephophorus
 Pseudochama
 †Pseudochama corticosa
 †Pseudochama corticosta
 Pseudoliva
 †Pseudoliva santander
 †Pseudoliva vetusta
 Pseudopolymorphina
 †Pseudopolymorphina novangliae – or unidentified comparable form
 Pseudotorinia
 †Pseudotorinia nupera
 †Pseudotorinia nuperum
 Pteria
 †Pteria colymbus
 †Pteria limula – tentative report
 Pteromeris
 †Pteromeris tridentata
 Pteromylaeus
 †Ptychosalpinx
 †Ptychosalpinx fossulata
 †Ptychosalpinx laqueata
 †Ptychosalpinx multirugata
 †Ptychosalpinx tuomeyi
 Pulvinites
 †Pulvinites lawrencei
  †Puppigerus
 †Puppigerus camperi
 Pycnodonte
  Pycnodus
 †Pyropsis

Q

  Quercus
 Quinqueloculina
 †Quinqueloculina compta
 †Quinqueloculina jugosa
 †Quinqueloculina lamarckiana
 †Quinqueloculina lamarkiana
 †Quinqueloculina microcosta
 †Quinqueloculina peyana
 †Quinqueloculina poeyana
 †Quinqueloculina seminula

R

 Raeta
 †Raeta plicatella
 Raja
 Rallus
  †Rallus limicola
 †Rana
  †Rana catesbiana – lapsus calami of Rana catesbeiana
 †Rana clamitans – or unidentified comparable form
 †Rana palustris
 †Rana pipiens
  †Rana sylvatica – or unidentified comparable form
 Rangia
 †Rangia clathrodon
 †Rangia cuneata
 Rangifer
  †Rangifer tarandus
 Ranzania
 †Ranzania grahami – type locality for species
 †Ranzania tenneyorum – type locality for species
 †Raphoneis
 †Raphoneis amphiceros
 †Raphoneis lancettula
 †Raphoneis scutula
 †Rebeccapecten
 †Rebeccapecten berryae
 Reticulofenestra
 †Retinella
 †Retinella electrina
 †Retinella virginica
 Retusa
 †Retusa obtusa
 †Rhabdosteus
 †Rhaphoneis
 †Rhaphoneis gemmifera
 †Rhaphoneis parilis
 †Rhegnopsis
 †Rhegnopsis palaeatlantica – type locality for species
  Rhinobatos
 †Rhinobatos bruxelliensis
  Rhinoptera
 †Rhinoptera sherboni
 Rosalina
 †Rosalina columbiensis
 †Rosalina floridana
 Rostellaria
 †Rudiscala

S

 Saccella
 †Saccella catasarca – or unidentified comparable form
 †Saccella concentrica
 †Saccella parva
 †Samlandia
 †Sanganoma
 †Sarda
 †Sarda delheidi
 Sayornis
  †Sayornis phoebe
 †Scala
 †Scala virginiana – type locality for species
 †Scalaspira – report made of unidentified related form or using admittedly obsolete nomenclature
 †Scalaspira strumosa
 Scalopus
  †Scalopus aquaticus
 Scaphella
  Scaphiopus
 †Scaphiopus holbrooki
 Sceloporus
 †Sceloporus undulatus
 †Sceptrum
 †Sceptrum marylandicum
  †Schizodelphis
 †Schizodelphis barnesi
 †Schizodelphis sulcatus
 Schizoporella
 †Schizoporella errata
 Sciaenops
 †Sciaenops ocellatus
 †Sciaenurus – or unidentified comparable form
 †Sciaenurus bowerbanki
 Sciuropterus
 †Sciuropterus volans
 Sciurus
  †Sciurus carolinensis
 Scolopax
 †Scolopax minor
 Scomberomorus
 †Scomberomorus bleekeri
 †Scombrinus
 Scyliorhinus
 †Scyliorhinus gilberti
 Seila
 †Seila adamsii
  †Seiurus
 Semele
 †Semele bellastriata
 †Semele purpurascens – or unidentified comparable form
 †Semele subovata
 †Semotilus
 †Semotilus corporalis – or unidentified comparable form
 Serpulorbis
 †Serpulorbis granifera
 †Serpulorbis granulifera
  †Serratolamna
 †Serratolamna aschersoni
 †Serratolamna lerichei
 †Sialia – or unidentified comparable form
  †Sialia sialis
 Sinum
 †Sinum fragilis
 †Siphonocetus
 †Siphonocetus priscus – type locality for species
 Sitta
 †Sitta canadensis
 †Solarium
 Solemya
 †Solemya velum
 Solen
 Solenosteira
 †Solenosteira cancellaria
 Sorex
 †Sorex arcticus
  †Sorex cinereus
 †Sorex dispar
 †Sorex fumeus
 †Sorex hoyi
  †Sorex palustris
 †Spatangus
 †Spatangus glenni
 Spermophilus
 †Spermophilus tridecemlineatus
 Sphaerium
 †Sphaerium striatinum
 †Sphaeroidinellopsis
 †Sphaeroidinellopsis subdehiscens
 Sphenia
 †Sphenia dubia
  Sphyraena
 †Sphyraena bognorensis
 †Sphyrapicus
 †Sphyrapicus varius
  Sphyrna
 Spilogale
 †Spilogale putorius
 †Spirodon
 †Spirodon carinata
 Spisula
 †Spisula modicella
 †Spisula parilis
 †Spisula praetenuis
 †Spisula rappahannockensis
  †Squalodon
 †Squalodon calvertensis
 †Squalodon protervus – or unidentified comparable form
 †Squalodon whitmorei – type locality for species
  Squalus
 †Squalus crenatidens
  Squatina
 †Squatina prima
 †Stenotrema
 †Stenotrema fraternum
 †Stenotrema hirsutum
 †Stephanopyxis
 †Stephanopyxis grunowii
 Stewartia
 †Stewartia anodonta
 Storeria
 †Strepsidura
 †Strepsidura perlatus
 †Streptochetus – or unidentified comparable form
 †Streptochetus potomacensis
 Striarca
 †Striarca centenaria
 †Striarca centernaria
  †Striatolamia
 †Striatolamia macrota
 Strioterebrum
 †Strioterebrum carolinensis
 †Strioterebrum concava
 †Strioterebrum dislocatum
 Strobilops
 †Strobilops labyrinthica
 Strombiformis
   Sturnella – or unidentified comparable form
 †Sullivanichthys – type locality for genus
 †Sullivanichthys mccloskeyi – type locality for species
 †Sumbos
 †Sumbos cavifrons
 Surculites
 Sveltia – or unidentified comparable form
 †Syllomus
 †Syllomus aegyptiacus – type locality for species
 †Syllomus crispatus
 Sylvilagus
  †Sylvilagus transitionalis
 Symplocos
 †Symplocos grimsleyi
 Synaptomys
 †Synaptomys cooperi
 †Synaptomys corealis

T

 Tagelus
 †Tagelus plebeius
 Tamias
 †Tamias striatus
 †Tamiasciurius
 †Tamiasciurius hudsonicus
 Tamiasciurus
  †Tamiasciurus hudsonicus
 †Tamiasciurus tenuidens – or unidentified comparable form
  Tapirus
 †Tapirus veroensis
 Tautoga
 †Tautoga onitis
 †Tectatodinium
 †Tectatodinium pellitum
  Tectonatica
 †Tectonatica pusilla
 Teinostoma
 †Teinostoma harrisi
 †Teinostoma umbilicatum
  Tellina
 †Tellina declivis
 †Tellina leana
 †Tellina propetenella
 †Tellina virginiana – type locality for species
 †Tellina williamsi
 †Teratichthys
 †Teratichthys antiquitatus
 Terebra
 Teredo
 †Teredo virginiana
 Terrapene
  †Terrapene carolina
 Textularia
 †Thalassiphora
 †Thalassiphora pelagica
 Thamnophis
 †Thamnophis sirtalis
  †Thecachampsa
 †Thecachampsa antiqua
 †Thecachampsa antiquua
 †Thinocetus – type locality for genus
 †Thinocetus arthritus – type locality for species
  †Thoracosaurus
 †Thoracosaurus neocesariensis
 Thracia
 †Thuja
 †Thuja occidentalis
  Thunnus
 Tilia
 Tinospora
 †Tinospora folmerii
 Torcula
 †Torcula variabilis
 †Tornatellaea
 Toxostoma
 †Toxostoma rufum
 Transennella
 †Transennella carolinensis
 †Tretosphys
 Triakis
 †Triakis wardi
 Trigonostoma
 Tringa – or unidentified comparable form
  †Tringa solitaria
 †Triodopsis
 †Triodopsis albolabris
 †Triodopsis burchi
 †Triodopsis juxtidens
  †Triodopsis tridentata
 †Triodopsis vulgata
 Triphora
 †Triphotrocha
 †Triphotrocha comprinata – or unidentified comparable form
 Trochita
 †Trochita aperta
 †Trochita trochiformis
 Trochocyathus
 †Trochocyathus mitratus
 Trox
 †Tsuga
 †Tsuga canadensis – or unidentified comparable form
 Tucetona
 †Tucetona pectinata
 Tudicla – or unidentified comparable form
 †Turbinolia
 †Turbinolia acuticostata
 †Turbiosphaera – tentative report
 Turbonilla
 †Turbonilla interrupta
 †Turbonilla potomacensis
 †Turborotalia – report made of unidentified related form or using admittedly obsolete nomenclature
 †Turborotalia acostaensis
 Turdus
  †Turdus migratorius
  Turritella
 †Turritella alticostata
 †Turritella humerosa
 †Turritella invariabilis
 †Turritella nasuta
 †Turritella pilsbryi
 †Turritella potomacensis
 †Turritella praecincta
 †Turritella subvariabilis

U

 Uria
  †Uria aalge
 Urosalpinx
 †Urosalpinx cinera
 †Urosalpinx cinerea
 †Urosalpinx phrikina
 †Urosalpinx rusticus
 †Urosalpinx subrusticus
 †Urosalpinx trossulus
 Ursus
 †Ursus americanus

V

 Vallonia
 †Vallonia costata
 Valvata
 Venericardia
 †Venericardia densata
 †Venericardia planicosta
 †Venericardia potapacoensis
 †Venericardia regia
 Vermetus
 Vertigo
 †Vertigo gouldi
 †Vertigo tridentata
  Vitis
 Vitrinella
 †Vitrinella virginiensis
 †Vokesinotus
 †Vokesinotus lepidotus
  †Voltaconger
 †Voltaconger latispinus
  Voluta
 †Voluta mutabilis
 Volutifusus
 †Volutifusus obtusa
 Vulpes

W

 †Wetherellia
 †Wetherellia marylandica
 †Wetzeliella

X

 Xenophora
  †Xiphiacetus
 †Xiphiacetus bossi – type locality for species
 †Xiphiacetus cristatus – type locality for species

Y

 Yoldia
 †Yoldia laevis
  †Yoldia limatula
 †Yoldia potomacensis

Z

 Zapus
 †Zapus hudsonius
 †Zarhachis
 Zonotrichia
  †Zonotrichia albicollis

Notes

References
 

Virginia
Cenozoic